Pular is a massive stratovolcano located in the Antofagasta Region of northern Chile, about 15 km west of the border with Argentina, which in this area is a straight line between the summits of Socompa volcano and Cerro del Rincón. Southward, following the same direction as the ridge, lies Socompa volcano. The ridge's crest forms a drainage divide between Salar de Atacama basin and Salar de Pular basin. This latter is a bowl-shaped basin enclosed on the east by Aracar volcano.

In the Kunza language Pular means "The Eyebrow" and the volcano was a site of Inka cultural activity.

Geology and geomorphology 

The Andes of northern Chile are formed by a number of volcanoes, some of which reach  elevation. During winter they are covered with snow but the climate of the region is arid and the snow disappears during the summer months; only on some high summits like Ojos del Salado and Llullaillaco does ice exist. However, traces of past glaciation occur on other volcanoes.

The massif consists of an alignment of volcanoes and two subunits, a heavily eroded unit that consists of Pajonales and Pular proper and a younger unit consisting of volcanic domes. Rocks of the older unit are 3.9 million years old, while one of the domes has been dated to be 1.8 million years old. Unverified reports indicate an explosive eruption in 1990, but the region is remote and renewed activity is unlikely to have any impact.

Numerous moraines occur within the drainage network of Pajonales-Pular. The mountain was extensively glaciated in the past, with five glacier systems on its northwestern and six on the southeastern slopes. A snowfield presently occupies one of the areas on the southeastern slopes that was formerly glaciated, and ephemeral lakes filled with snowmelt water occasionally appear on the mountain.

See also
 List of volcanoes in Chile
 List of Ultras of South America
 Caichinque
 Monturaqui crater
 List of andean peaks with known pre-columbian ascents

References

Sources 

 }

External links
 "Cerro Pular, Chile" on Peakbagger

Volcanoes of Antofagasta Region
Stratovolcanoes of Chile
Six-thousanders of the Andes